"Naked Eye" is a song by The Who, written by Pete Townshend. The studio version was released on the group's 1974 compilation album Odds and Sods (reissued in 1998). Live versions appear on Live at the Isle of Wight Festival 1970, View from a Backstage Pass, Greatest Hits Live, Thirty Years of Maximum R&B, and both reissues of Who's Next.

Background
One of the main chord progressions in "Naked Eye" can be traced to the spring and summer of 1969 when the band was touring in support of the Tommy album. The three-chord riff (F6/9-Cadd9-G) was sometimes played during the group's very long and improvised versions of "Magic Bus" at that time, then later in expanded jams during "My Generation", as heard in the Live at Leeds version. Eventually Townshend composed an entire song around this progression.

"Naked Eye" was originally planned to be released on a 1970 Who EP entitled 6 ft. Wide Garage, 7 ft. Wide Car, a collection which was also to include "Water", "I Don't Even Know Myself", “Now I’m a Farmer”, and "Postcard." There were also plans to release a live version of the song, but neither plan materialized.

Recording
The band likely began recording the song in 1970 during sessions for an EP that was eventually aborted when Townshend began focusing on his Lifehouse rock opera (these same sessions also yielded “I Don’t Even Know Myself”, “Water”, “Postcard”, and “Now I’m a Farmer”). It was eventually completed in the spring of 1971 during sessions for Who's Next, which included several numbers originally intended for Lifehouse. Evidence that the piece had been started but not completed can be heard in a BBC performance of the song from December 1970 in which the band mimed to the studio recording, which was faded out before the third verse (then likely not yet recorded) could be heard. The version on the remastered edition of Odds and Sods is longer than the original, which had been slightly edited.

Live history
"Naked Eye" was debuted in live form during the band's American tour in June–July 1970, generally as part of long medleys during "My Generation". These versions never included the third verse, which wasn't heard until 1971. The song was a regular part of the group's act in 1971 and 1972, again usually following “My Generation”, then became a frequent encore in 1973-74. It appeared less often in the band's 1975-76 shows and was played for the last time with Keith Moon during the group's concert at Madison Square Garden in New York on March 11, 1976. Since then it has been performed during each era of the band's existence, though never regularly. The song has been played in varying arrangements through the years, but never in the exact arrangement of the original studio recording. Versions from 1996-2000 featured Roger Daltrey singing the first verse unaccompanied while playing acoustic guitar.

References

1971 songs
The Who songs
Songs written by Pete Townshend